Kabambare is a territory in Maniema province of the Democratic Republic of the Congo. It comprises six collectivities: Babuyu, Bahemba (Kibangula), Bahombo (Kabambare), Lulindi, Saramabila, and Wamaza. The majority of the residents are speakers of Bangubangu. Buyu, and Hemba.

Territories of Maniema Province